Graeme Lee may refer to:
Graeme Lee (Australian footballer) (born 1939), Australian rules player
Graeme Lee (footballer, born 1978), English association football player
Graeme Lee (politician) (born 1935), New Zealand politician

See also
Graham Lee (disambiguation)